Shoely Mabel Mego Contreras (born 1999) is a Peruvian weightlifter. She won the silver medal in women's 55kg event at the 2022 South American Games held in Asunción, Paraguay. She also won two bronze medals at the 2022 Bolivarian Games held in Valledupar, Colombia.

Career 

In 2019, she represented Peru at the Pan American Games in Lima, Peru in the women's 55kg event. She finished in 6th place. In that same year, she competed in the women's 55kg event at the World Weightlifting Championships held in Pattaya, Thailand.

She won the bronze medal in the women's 55kg Clean & Jerk event at the 2020 Pan American Weightlifting Championships held in Santo Domingo, Dominican Republic.

She won two bronze medals at the 2022 Bolivarian Games held in Valledupar, Colombia. She won the silver medal in her event at the 2022 South American Games held in Asunción, Paraguay.

She won the bronze medal in the women's 55kg Clean & Jerk event at the 2022 World Weightlifting Championships held in Bogotá, Colombia.

Achievements

References

External links 
 

Living people
1999 births
Place of birth missing (living people)
Peruvian female weightlifters
Weightlifters at the 2019 Pan American Games
Pan American Games competitors for Peru
South American Games silver medalists for Peru
South American Games medalists in weightlifting
Competitors at the 2022 South American Games
21st-century Peruvian women